Flavius Lucian Boroncoi (born 5 June 1976) is a Romanian football manager and former player. As a player, Boroncoi grew up in Gaz Metan Mediaș Academy and made his debut in the Divizia A, during the 2000–01 season. Subsequently, he played mostly for second division clubs succh as FC Onești, Jiul Petroșani, Minerul Lupeni or Arieșul Turda, among others.

As a manager, he worked as an assistant coach for several clubs including Voința Sibiu, Pandurii Târgu Jiu, Unirea Alba Iulia or Politehnica Iași, but mostly for Gaz Metan Mediaș.

Honours
Gaz Metan Mediaș
Divizia B: 1999–2000

Voința Sibiu
Liga III: 2009–10

References

External links
 

1976 births
People from Mediaș
Living people
Romanian footballers
Association football midfielders
Liga I players
Liga II players
Liga III players
CS Gaz Metan Mediaș players
CSM Jiul Petroșani players
CS Minerul Lupeni players
ACS Sticla Arieșul Turda players
FC Olt Slatina players
CSU Voința Sibiu players
Romanian football managers
CS Gaz Metan Mediaș managers
Liga I managers